{{Infobox language
| name = Chuj
| nativename = Koti| states = Guatemala, Mexico
| region = Northern Huehuetenango, Chiapas
| ethnicity = 91,400 Chuj in Guatemala (2019 census)
| speakers =  in Guatemala
| date = 2019 census
| ref = e24
|script=Latin
| speakers2 =  in Mexico (2020 census)

| familycolor = American
| fam1 = Mayan
| fam2 = Qʼanjobalan–Chujean
| fam3 = Chujean
| minority = 
| iso3 = cac
| glotto = chuj1250
| glottorefname = Chuj
}}Chuj  is a Mayan language spoken by around 40,000 members of the Chuj people in Guatemala and around 3,000 members in Mexico. Chuj is a member of the Qʼanjobʼalan branch along with  the languages of Tojolabʼal, Qʼanjobʼal, Akateko, Poptiʼ, and Mochoʼ which, together with the Chʼolan branch, Chuj forms the Western branch of the Mayan family.  The Chujean branch emerged approximately 2,000 years ago.  In Guatemala, Chuj speakers mainly reside in the municipalities of San Mateo Ixtatán, San Sebastián Coatán and Nentón in the Huehuetenango Department. Some communities in Barillas and Ixcán also speak Chuj. The two main dialects of Chuj are the San Mateo Ixtatán dialect and the San Sebastián Coatán dialect.

The Chuj language has been influenced by Spanish, and Chuj speakers have a tendency to borrow Spanish words or code-mix. It is estimated that 70% of the Chuj language is purely Chuj. There are language conservation and revitalization efforts taking place in San Mateo Ixtatán, through groups like the Academia de Lenguas Mayas de Guatemala.

Phonology

Phonemic Inventory

Orthography 

The letter 'h' is conventionally used in words with initial vowels to distinguish them from words that begin with a glottal stop.

Grammar

Verb stem morphology

Below is a template for the verbal stem in Chuj. Verbal predicates in Chuj appear with a status suffix: -a with transitive verbs and –i with intransitive verbs. Finite clauses inflect for Tense-Aspect, person, and number.

{| class="wikitable"
|+Verb structure
|-
| {{interlinear|style1 = font-weight:bold;|italics1=no|italics2=yes|glossing3=yes
|Tense/aspect/mood {Absolutive marker} {Ergative marker} {Verb root} {Status suffix}
|tz- ach- in- chel- aʼ
|IPFV 2SG.ABS 1SG.ERG hug TR
|tzachinchela 'I am hugging you.'}}
|}

Non-verbal predicates
Non-verbal predicates are non-verbal words like adjectives, nouns, positionals, or directionals that act as the main predicate and are semantically stative. These constructions do not inflect for Tense-Aspect, but do inflect for person and number. There is no overt copula in Chuj and copula constructions are expressed through non-verbal predicates.

Person-markers
Chuj is an ergative-absolutive language. The subject of an intransitive verb and the object of a transitive verb are both cross-referenced with an absolutive marker, which appears in the verbal stem. The subject of a transitive verb is cross-referenced with an ergative marker in the verbal stem.

Tense-Aspect
Chuj has four attested Tense-Aspect markers. Finite clauses inflect obligatorily for Tense-Aspect.

Nominal classifiers
Chuj nominal classifiers represent a closed class of approximately a dozen words. They specify gender for humans, and the base material for objects, such as wood (teʼ) for houses and metal (kʼen) for knives.

Chuj nominal classifiers have two main functions: they act as articles for referential nouns, and as pronouns. They have a lexical origin, but have undergone semantic bleaching and may therefore refer to a larger semantic field than the nominals that they are derived from.

 Articles for referential nouns

 Pronouns

Numbers 1 through 10 in Chuj

A tongue twister in Chuj from San Sebastián CoatánNokʼ Xankatat yetʼ nokʼxeʼen

Xenhxni xekxni xanhxni hinbʼeyi

Xankatak xanhbʼ wekʼ a stixalu

Xchi nokʼ xankat a nokʼ xeʼen,

Xwila xwabi, xelabʼa to ojinwekla,

to jinxekla manhx ojinwekla.

Notes

References

External links
Chuj – English Dictionary of the Chuj (Mayan) Language, Hopkins, Nicholas A., 2012
Chuj Talking Dictionary, 2014. Chuj Talking Dictionary. K’ulb’il Yol Twitz Paxil / The Academy of Mayan Languages, Living Tongues Institute for Endangered Languages.
Academia de las Lenguas Mayas

Mayan languages
Agglutinative languages
Indigenous languages of Central America
Indigenous languages of Mexico
Languages of Guatemala
Huehuetenango Department
Mesoamerican languages
Verb–object–subject languages